Sidney High School is a comprehensive, college-prep oriented public high school in Sidney, Ohio which is located  north of Dayton, Ohio on Interstate 75. It is the only public high school in the Sidney City Schools district. 

Sidney High School average enrollment is approximately 1,000, with approximately 200 students attending the Upper Valley Career Center in Piqua, OH. The average graduating class size is approximately 250 students.

Sidney City Schools offers more than 70 extracurricular activities for students from 6th grade on. Sports include: football; boys & girls soccer; boys & girls basketball; boys baseball; girls fastpitch; boys & girls tennis; co-ed track; co-ed bowling; co-ed swimming; co-ed cross country; girls volleyball; co-ed wrestling; weight lifting; cheerleading; marching band; and golf. Clubs include: Academia, Mock Trial, Breakfast Club, Key Club, Art Club, FFA, FCCLA; Debate Club; Environthon; German Club; Muse Machine; SADD; Student Government; National Honor Society; DECA; and Intramural Athletics.

Athletics
Sidney High School is a long time member of the Miami Valley League (MVL). The Yellow Jacket's primary rival is Piqua High School.

OHSAA State Championships
2020 Boys Bowling

Notable alumni
 Warren Davidson, congressman (1989)
 Paul Lauterbur, chemist and Nobel Laureate (1947)
 Lois Lenski, writer (1911)

Sidney City Schools has a Hall of Honor which recognizes other notable alumni. More than 100 members make up the Sidney High School Hall of Honor, which was established in 1994, honoring their outstanding achievements and contributions to our community and world.

External links
 Sidney High School
 Sidney City Schools Hall of Honor

Notes and references

High schools in Shelby County, Ohio
Sidney, Ohio
Public high schools in Ohio